Volavlje is a settlement in the hills to the east of the Ljubljana in central Slovenia. It belongs to the City Municipality of Ljubljana. The area is part of the traditional region of Lower Carniola and is now included in the Central Slovenia Statistical Region.

References

External links

Volavlje on Geopedia

Populated places in the City Municipality of Ljubljana
Sostro District